In Greek mythology, the name Demodice (Ancient Greek: Δημοδίκη) may refer to:

Demodice, daughter of Agenor, also known as Demonice.
Demodice or Demodika (also known as Gorgopis, Themisto, or Biadice), second wife of either Cretheus or Athamas, who unsuccessfully attempted to seduce Phrixus and in revenge accused him of sexual abuse, which caused him to flee from his father's kingdom.
Demodice, daughter of Rheximachus of Tegea. After Tegea had been at war with Phenea for a long time, the cities agreed to put an end to the conflict by electing a set of triplet brothers to represent each side and letting the victorious side be determined in a fight between them. The Tegeans sent the three sons of Rheximachus, brothers of Demodice, while the Pheneans sent the three sons of Demostratus, one of whom, Demodicus, was betrothed to Demodice. Two of Rheximachus' sons were killed in the fight, but the third brother, Critolaus, outwitted his opponents by pretending to flee from them and then slaying them one by one as they were pursuing him, and thus brought victory to Tegea. Demodice, however, mourned her fiancé Demodicus rather than celebrate the victory, and was killed by Critolaus for being unpatriotic. His mother charged him with the murder but he was acquitted.
Demodice of Lydia, daughter of Leucothea and a father whose name is lost in the manuscript. During a festival of Aphrodite, she was raped by her brother Pactolus, who had failed to recognize her; upon realizing what he had done, Pactolus threw himself into the river Chrysorrhoos, which allegedly was renamed Pactolus after him.
Demodice, mother by Corybas of Scamander. Her son accidentally saw the goddess Rhea while taking part in her sacred mysteries; driven insane by her, he ran off and fell into the river Xanthus, which from that circumstance received the second name Scamander.
Demodice, one of the sacrificial victims of Minotaur.

Notes

References 

 Apollodorus, The Library with an English Translation by Sir James George Frazer, F.B.A., F.R.S. in 2 Volumes, Cambridge, MA, Harvard University Press; London, William Heinemann Ltd. 1921. ISBN 0-674-99135-4. Online version at the Perseus Digital Library. Greek text available from the same website.
 Gaius Julius Hyginus, Astronomica from The Myths of Hyginus translated and edited by Mary Grant. University of Kansas Publications in Humanistic Studies. Online version at the Topos Text Project.
 Lucius Mestrius Plutarchus, Morals translated from the Greek by several hands. Corrected and revised by. William W. Goodwin, PH. D. Boston. Little, Brown, and Company. Cambridge. Press Of John Wilson and son. 1874. 5. Online version at the Perseus Digital Library.

Women in Greek mythology
Characters in Greek mythology